Gustav Fischer may refer to:
 Gustav Fischer (explorer) (1848–1886), German explorer of Africa
 Gustav Fischer (equestrian) (1915–1990), Swiss equestrian
 Gustav Fischer (politician), American politician